Amphilimnobia is a genus of crane fly in the family Limoniidae.

Species
A. leucopeza Alexander, 1920

References

Limoniidae
Tipuloidea genera